Waikejiao Island(), (33°0'54"N, 121°38'24"E) is a small sand island located in the East China Sea, adjacent to Jiangsu. Macaiheng is close by.

Waikejiao is one of the baseline points of the Chinese territorial sea.

Notes and references

See also

Macaiheng()
Sheshandao()

External links
 Declaration of the Government of the People's Republic of China on the baselines of the territorial sea(May15th, 1996)
中国东海１０座领海基点石碑建成
中华人民共和国政府关于中华人民共和国领海基线的声明(1996年5月15日)

Islands of Jiangsu
Baselines of the Chinese territorial sea
Islands of the East China Sea